Maria de Cardona or Maria Folch de Cardona (1509, probably in Naples - 9 March 1563, Naples) was an Italian noblewoman and patron of the arts. She was from the Folch de Cardona family. de Cardona was the Countess of Avellino, Marquise of Padula, and Baroness of Candida and habitually lived in the Irpinia castle.

Bibliography
Emilio Sarli, La decima musa del Parnaso: Maria de Cardona, Tricase, Youcanprint, 2012, .

References

Nobility from Naples
House of Este
1509 births
1563 deaths